James O'Toole (died 24 September 1969) was an Irish Fianna Fáil politician. He was from Ballinamuck, County Longford. A publican, he was elected to Dáil Éireann as a Fianna Fáil Teachta Dála (TD) for the Wicklow constituency at the 1957 general election. He lost his seat at the 1961 general election.

References

1969 deaths
Year of birth missing
Fianna Fáil TDs
Members of the 16th Dáil
Politicians from County Wicklow